Dendropsophus leucophyllatus (common names: Beireis' treefrog, also white-leaf frog and clown treefrog) is a species of frog in the family Hylidae. It is found in the Amazon Basin (Bolivia, Brazil, Colombia, Ecuador, French Guiana, Guyana, Peru, Suriname, and possibly Venezuela).
This widespread and locally common species is found near water in a wide variety of tropical habitats. There are no known significant threats to this species.

References

leucophyllatus
Amphibians of Bolivia
Amphibians of Brazil
Amphibians of Colombia
Amphibians of Ecuador
Amphibians of French Guiana
Amphibians of Guyana
Amphibians of Peru
Amphibians of Suriname
Amphibians described in 1783
Taxonomy articles created by Polbot